Three ships of the Royal Navy have borne the name HMS Newark, after the town Newark-on-Trent:
 , 80-gun third rate ship of the line that was launched in 1695 and served until 1787
 , a Hunt-class minesweeper laid down as Newlyn and commissioned in 1918. She was broken up in 1928. 
 , the Wickes-class destroyer USS Ringgold (DD-89) that served in the Royal Navy between 1940 and 1947

See also
 Newark (disambiguation)

References

Royal Navy ship names